Don't Stop Dreaming  is a film directed by Aditya Raj Kapoor (son of actor Shammi Kapoor), produced by Munir Ahmad and set in Birmingham, England. Bollywood actors Rishi Kapoor and Sunil Shetty, EastEnders actress Michelle Collins, DJ and actor Richard Blackwood and singer Taz in his acting debut star in the film, which was released on 16 March 2007.

Cast
 Rishi Kapoor as Groovy
 Sunil Shetty as Dave 
 Michelle Collins
 Richard Blackwood
 Taz as Channi Singh
 Ronny Jhutti
 Junior Simpson
 Jags Klimax
 Sigga as Gabby
 Henry Paulinski
 Serena Verdi
 Tarlochan Singh Bilga
 Matt McCooey as Bobby

Release 
BBC gave the film a rating of one out of five stars and wrote that "With a cast that comprises Bollywood C-listers, known British TV "stars", evidently with time on their hands, and a band of multi-ethnic "actors, " the worst of East and West combine for this fine example of how not to make a film".

References

External links
 
 Don't Stop Dreaming on Myspace
 Don't Stop Dreaming Trailer on YouTube

2007 films
British comedy-drama films
British Indian films
2000s English-language films
2000s British films